Judges who served on the Commonwealth Industrial Court or when it was renamed the Australian Industrial Court are:

References

Commonwealth Industrial Court